The Focke-Wulf A 33 Sperber (German: "Sparrowhawk") was a small airliner, produced in Germany in the early 1930s. It was a high-wing cantilever monoplane of conventional design, resembling a scaled-down version of the contemporary A 32 design. Only three examples were built, each purchased for air taxi duties with separate German airlines. One eventually briefly joined the fleet of Deutsche Luft Hansa in 1937.

Specifications

References

 
 
 German aircraft between 1919-1945

1930s German airliners
A 33
Single-engined tractor aircraft
High-wing aircraft
Aircraft first flown in 1930